William Wallace Woodman (March 24, 1818February 26, 1901) was an American lawyer, farmer, Democratic politician, and Wisconsin pioneer.  He served four years in the Wisconsin State Senate and two years in the State Assembly, representing Jefferson County.

Biography

William W. Woodman was born in the town of Rodman, New York, on March 24, 1818.  He came to the Wisconsin Territory in 1839, settling first in Rock County.  He relocated to Farmington, in Jefferson County, in 1844. For over 40 years he was justice of the peace at Johnson Creek, Wisconsin.

Woodman was active in the Democratic Party of Wisconsin.  He was a member of the Wisconsin State Assembly in the 1853 and 1856 sessions, representing northeast Jefferson County.  He was subsequently elected to the Wisconsin State Senate in 1868 and 1870, serving from 1869 through 1872.

Woodman died on February 26, 1901, at the home of his son in La Prairie, Wisconsin.

References

|-

1818 births
1901 deaths
Democratic Party members of the Wisconsin State Assembly
People from Jefferson County, New York
People from Jefferson County, Wisconsin
Democratic Party Wisconsin state senators
19th-century American politicians